Aurora Colony, also called Aurora Mills, was a Christian utopian communal society founded in 1856 by William Keil in modern-day Aurora, Oregon, US. The colony, along with Keil's previously established Bethel colony, was formally dissolved in 1883.

Background
William Keil was a Prussian-born tailor who moved to the United States with his wife in the 1830s. He opened open a tailor shop in New York City, and studied pharmacology. He then moved to Pennsylvania and set up a drugstore and sold medicines. Around this time, he began calling himself "Dr. Keil".

In 1839, Keil became a preacher after attending a Methodist revival meeting. In Pennsylvania, he began to amass followers, including members of George Rapp's Economy Colony. In 1844 he and his followers established the Bethel community in Missouri, which at its peak had 650 members.

Founding
Though Keil's community in Missouri was successful and nearly self-sufficient, he decided to expand his colony to the Pacific Northwest of the United States. In 1853, he sent a scout party to find a location for "A Second Eden".

In May 1855, Keil and several members of his Bethel colony in Missouri began the wagon journey to Washington Territory. Four days before they set out, Keil's son Willy died of malaria. Not wanting to leave his son behind, Keil put the body in a wooden, lead-lined coffin and covered it with whiskey from the Bethel Distillery to preserve it.

The group first settled at Willapa Bay, Washington. After spending the winter there, Keil decided the land was not suitable for a self-sufficient agricultural community and began searching for a new location. In 1856 he purchased land and a functioning mill south of Oregon City. He named the Colony Aurora Mills after his daughter, Aurora. The original colony contained 250 members who had left the Bethel Colony with Keil.

Colonial life
The Aurora Colony built homes, schools, business, mills, and a hotel. The colony also created a fruit orchard and produced hand-made goods. The Oregon & California Railway line expanded to pass through Aurora in 1870, which brought additional business to the colony. The train stopped four times a day for meals in its hotel.

The Aurora Colony Band became well known on the West Coast, and traveled throughout the region to perform music.

The charismatic Keil was the sole leader of the group. As the spiritual leader, he installed his own form of Christianity in the community. Keil preached a simple ideal about brotherhood and love and taught a "No title but Christian" and "No rules but the Bible" form of Christianity, maintaining that all existing religions were human creations.

As in many other utopian communities, its founder held special privileges. He instated confession in order to maintain the member's humility, yet was immune from taking part in confession himself. He was also exempt from taking part in manual labor. Keil lived in a large house in the colony, called "Gross Haus"  (German for Big House).

As part of keeping order and maintaining his place in the community, Keil utilized mortification functions, calling out deviants for their transgressions during public meetings.

Smallpox outbreak
In 1862, a member of the colony took care of an individual outside the colony who had smallpox and brought it back to the Aurora Colony. As a result, many in Aurora contracted the disease and many died. Four of Keil's children died in the outbreak, including his daughter Aurora, the colony's namesake.

Dissolution of the colony
Keil had held all the communal property in his name. In 1872, after the death of his only remaining daughter, Keil began to transfer ownership of colony land to individual families in the community and intended to transfer more later. However, by the time he died suddenly on December 30, 1877, he had not made any additional transfers.

It was decided to dissolve the two colonies, and the dissolution was formally declared on January 22, 1883. The land was later incorporated and became the modern-day city of Aurora, Oregon.

Legacy
In 1966 the Old Aurora Colony Museum was established, dedicated to maintaining the history of the colony. In 1974, twenty sites in Aurora were added to the National Register of Historical Places.

In media
Author Jane Kirkpatrick wrote a trilogy of novels about the experience of Emma Wagner Giesy, the only female member of Keil's scout party to find a location for a new colony in the Pacific Northwest that eventually became the Aurora Colony. The three novels in Kirkpatrick's series are "A Clearing in the Wild" (2006), "A Tendering In the Storm" (2007), and "Mending at the Edge" (2008).

See also
List of American Utopian communities
National Register of Historic Places listings in Marion County, Oregon

References

Further reading 
 Hendricks: Bethel and Aurora (see: George Stanley Turnbull (1939), "Journalism in Salem" , History of Oregon Newspapers, Binford & Mort)

External links
 Aurora Colony Museum
 
 wikisource:en:Oregon Historical Quarterly/Volume 37/Number 4#363

1856 establishments in Oregon Territory
1883 disestablishments in the United States
Utopian communities in the United States
Christian communities
19th century in Washington (state)
National Register of Historic Places in Marion County, Oregon
Historic districts on the National Register of Historic Places in Oregon
Aurora, Oregon